K. M. Sachin Dev is an Indian politician from Kerala. He is the member of Kerala Legislative Assembly from Balussery constituency, since May 2021. He is the youngest MLA in 15th Kerala Legislative Assembly. He is the State Secretary of Students' Federation of India, Kerala State Committee.

Early life
Sachin was born to K. M. Nandakumar and Sheeja at Nellikode in Kozhikode district of Kerala, India. His father is a retired employee in Mathrubhumi. His mother is a teacher at Government Higher Secondary School, Medical College Campus, Kozhikode. He has a sister, Sandra K. M.. Sachin completed his schooling from Savio Higher Secondary School, Devagiri and Government HSS Medical College Campus, Kozhikode. He did his bachelor's degree in English literature from Government College, Meenchantha. He pursued LLB from Government Law College, Kozhikode and enrolled as a lawyer in 2019.

Career

Student politics 
He started his political life as a member of Students Federation of India (SFI). He was the former chairman of the Government Arts and Science College, Kozhikode. He has held the office of president and later secretary of SFI Kozhikode district committee. He is currently the state secretary of SFI committee in Kerala, and the All India Joint Secretary of SFI.

Party politics 
Sachin is a Kozhikode Town Area Committee member of CPI(M). In 2021 Kerala Legislative Assembly election he won against  Dharmajan Bolgatty  at Balussery Constituency with a massive lead  of 20,372 votes. He was also the youngest in the list of candidates announced by the CPI(M) for the 2021 state assembly polls.

Personal life 
In 2022, he married Arya Rajendran, who is the Mayor of Thiruvananthapuram Corporation.

References 

Kerala MLAs 2021–2026
Communist Party of India (Marxist) politicians from Kerala
1993 births
Living people